is a 2009 thriller. The production traveled to New York for filming at the classic Hotel Chelsea, a place regularly visited by celebrities, after which the film was named.

Plot 
A newlywed Japanese couple travel to the Hotel Chelsea in New York City to enjoy their honeymoon. One night, the wife finds the lifeless body of her husband and a video containing footage of the brutal murder. A police detective arrives at the scene and tries to reconstruct the events surrounding the mysterious crime.

Festivals
 Radar Hamburg International Independent Film Festival (Nov 2, 2009)
 Queens International Film Festival (Nov 15, 2009)
 Myrtle Beach International Film Festival (Dec 4, 2009)
 Best Foreign Picture
 Best Actress
 Indie Spirit Film Festival (Apr 23, 2010)
 Seattle's True Independent Film Festival (Jun 9, 2010)
 Okanagan International Film Festival (Jul 23, 2010)
 Rhode Island International Film Festival (Aug 14, 2010)
 Eerie Horror Film Festival (Oct 10, 2010)
 Japan Film Fest Hamburg (May 29, 2011)

Release 
Early reviews for Hotel Chelsea at the 2009 Radar Hamburg International Independent Film Festival drew applause at its premiere. Hotel Chelsea official premiered in Tokyo on May 8, 2009 to critical acclaim and commercial success. In July 2010 was released on DVD.
Since March 2011, Hotel Chelsea has been available online for free and it established a long term earthquake and tsunami relief fund for Japan.

References

External links 
 Official Site
 

2009 films
2009 thriller films
Japanese thriller films
2000s Japanese-language films
2000s Japanese films